Gerhard Redl (born April 18, 1962, in Dimbach, Upper Austria) is an Austrian bobsledder who won competed from the late 1980s to the mid-1990s. He won four medals in the four-man event at the FIBT World Championships with three silvers (1986, 1993, 1995) and one bronze (1990).

Competing in three Winter Olympics, Redl earned his best finish of fourth in the four-man event at Lillehammer in 1994.

References
 1984 bobsleigh four-man results
 1988 bobsleigh four-man results
 1994 bobsleigh four-man results
 Bobsleigh four-man world championship medalists since 1930

1962 births
Austrian male bobsledders
Bobsledders at the 1984 Winter Olympics
Bobsledders at the 1988 Winter Olympics
Bobsledders at the 1994 Winter Olympics
Olympic bobsledders of Austria
Living people